Mara Kovačević (born 12 December 1975) is a Serbian judoka.

She represented FR Yugoslavia at the 2000 Summer Olympics.
Kovačević won bronze medals at the 2001 European Judo Championships in Paris and 2003 World Judo Championships in Osaka.
She also won 2 bronze medals at the Mediterranean Games.

In 2002, the Olympic Committee of Serbia decided to declare her the sportswoman of the year.

References

External links
 
 

1975 births
Living people
Serbian female judoka
Judoka at the 2000 Summer Olympics
Olympic judoka of Yugoslavia
Mediterranean Games bronze medalists for Yugoslavia
Competitors at the 1997 Mediterranean Games
Competitors at the 2001 Mediterranean Games
Mediterranean Games medalists in judo